The Archaeographic Commission (Археографическая комиссия) was set up in St. Petersburg in 1834 by Platon Shirinsky-Shikhmatov, Nikolay Ustryalov, and Pavel Stroyev with the aim of publishing historical and ethnographic materials assembled by Stroyev and others in the provinces of Imperial Russia.

The commission was affiliated with the imperial ministry of education and was modeled on an earlier commission based in Moscow. Its first major enterprise was the Complete Collection of Russian Chronicles, published from 1841 onward. Regional archaeographical commissions were established in Kiev, Vilna, and Tiflis. The commission spearheaded efforts to obtain foreign sources on Russian history and sent its emissaries in search of Russia-related documents to the major archives of Europe.

After Shirinsky-Shikhmatov the commission's presidents included Avraam Norov (1850–69), Vladimir Titov (1871–91), Sergei Platonov (1918–29), Nikolay Likhachov (1929), and Mikhail Pokrovsky (1930–32).

In the 20th century the institution went through several reorganizations and name changes (it was known as the Historical-Archaeographic Institute and the Historical-Archaeographic Commission of the Soviet Academy of Sciences). The modern archaeographic commission was founded in 1956 by Mikhail Tikhomirov as a branch of the Academy's history department.

Palaeography
Learned societies of Russia
Archives in Russia
Russian studies
1834 establishments in the Russian Empire